Zaid Ashkanani (born 24 May 1994) is a Kuwaiti racing driver.

Career

Porsche GT3 Cup Challenge Middle East
Ashkanani began racing in the Porsche GT3 Cup Challenge Middle East in 2012 and already in his first year he managed to get on the podium. In his second season, he became champion having achieved three wins and eight podiums. In the 2014–15 season he lost the championship in the final race. Clemens Schmid became champion that season twelve points in front of Ashkanani.

GP3 Series
On February 12, 2015 Campos Racing announced that Ashkanani would join the team for 2015.

Racing record

Career summary

 Not eligible for points.

Complete Porsche Supercup results
(key) (Races in bold indicate pole position) (Races in italics indicate fastest lap)

‡ As Ashkanani was a guest driver, he was ineligible for points.
† Driver did not finish the race, but was classified as he completed over 75% of the race distance.

Complete GP3 Series results
(key) (Races in bold indicate pole position) (Races in italics indicate fastest lap)

References

External links

1994 births
Living people
Kuwaiti racing drivers
GP3 Series drivers
Porsche Supercup drivers
Audi Sport TT Cup drivers
Kuwaiti people of Iranian descent
ADAC Formel Masters drivers
Formula Ford drivers
Blancpain Endurance Series drivers
Campos Racing drivers
Walter Lechner Racing drivers
FIA Motorsport Games drivers
Fluid Motorsport Development drivers
24H Series drivers
Porsche Carrera Cup Germany drivers